Nicolas Penneteau (born 20 February 1981) is a French professional footballer who plays as a goalkeeper for Reims.

Career
Born in Marseille, Penneteau has made over 400 Ligue 1 appearances in a career with Bastia and Valenciennes.

He joined the Corsican football team Bastia to play with them in the Corsica Cup 2010.

He made 159 consecutive Ligue 1 appearances for Valenciennes from 2010 to 2014.

In August 2014, Penneteau left France for the first time, signing a two-year contract with Sporting Charleroi.

References

External links
 
 

1981 births
Living people
People from Porto-Vecchio
Association football goalkeepers
French footballers
France youth international footballers
France under-21 international footballers
Corsica international footballers
SC Bastia players
Valenciennes FC players
R. Charleroi S.C. players
Stade de Reims players
Ligue 1 players
Ligue 2 players
Belgian Pro League players
French expatriate footballers
Expatriate footballers in Belgium
French expatriate sportspeople in Belgium
Footballers from Corsica
Footballers from Marseille
Sportspeople from Corse-du-Sud